James Conquest Cross Black (May 9, 1842 – October 1, 1928) was a nineteenth-century politician and lawyer from Kentucky and Georgia.

Early life
Born in Stamping Ground, Kentucky, Black attended common schools as a child, attended high school in New Castle, Kentucky and graduated from Georgetown College in 1862.

During the Civil War, he enlisted as a private in Company A of the 9th Kentucky Cavalry in the Confederate Army.

After the close of the war, Black moved to Augusta, Georgia in 1865, studied law and was admitted to the bar in 1866, commencing practice in Augusta.

Career
He was a member of the Georgia House of Representatives from 1873 to 1877, served as president of the Augusta Orphan Asylum from 1879 to 1886, was a member of the Augusta city council and was Augusta city attorney.

Black was elected as a Democrat to the United States House of Representatives in 1892, defeating incumbent Populist Tom Watson. Black and Watson faced off again in the election of 1894. Black was declared the winner of the election but Watson charged that the vote was fraudulent. Black agreed to resign his seat just after the opening of the 54th Congress so that a new election could be held. In the October 1895 special election, Black prevailed over Watson again, and thus took his seat back to fill the vacancy caused by his own resignation. He served in the House until 1897, not being a candidate for renomination in 1896. Afterward, he resumed practicing law in Augusta, Georgia until his death.

Death
Black died in Augusta on October 1, 1928. He was interred in Magnolia Cemetery in Augusta.

Notes

External links
 
 

'

1842 births
1928 deaths
Members of the Georgia House of Representatives
Kentucky Democrats
Georgia (U.S. state) lawyers
Confederate States Army soldiers
People from New Castle, Kentucky
People from Scott County, Kentucky
People of Kentucky in the American Civil War
Politicians from Augusta, Georgia
Georgia (U.S. state) city council members
Georgetown College (Kentucky) alumni
Democratic Party members of the United States House of Representatives from Georgia (U.S. state)
19th-century American lawyers